Marine architecture is the design of architectural and engineering structures which support coastal design, near-shore and off-shore or deep-water planning for many projects such as shipyards, ship transport, coastal management or other marine and/or hydroscape activities. These structures include harbors, lighthouses, marinas, oil platforms, offshore drillings, accommodation platforms and offshore wind farms, floating engineering structures and building architectures or civil seascape developments. Floating structures in deep water may use suction caisson for anchoring.

See also

, a temporary water-excluding structure built in place, sometimes surrounding a working area as does an open caisson.

Photo gallery

References

External links

 
Water and the environment
Offshore engineering